Richard Ian Smyth (born 19 November 1951) is an English school headmaster and cricketer.

Early life
Smyth was born at Bishopwearmouth, County Durham, and educated at Sedbergh School and Emmanuel College, Cambridge, where he gained a BA degree and PGCE.

Cricket
Smyth was a right-handed batsman who bowled leg break, and who occasionally fielded as a wicket-keeper.  While studying at the University of Cambridge, he made his first-class cricket debut for Cambridge University against Warwickshire in 1973.  He made nineteen further first-class appearances for the university, the last of which came against Oxford University in the 1975 The University Match at Lord's.  In his twenty first-class appearances for Oxford University, he scored a total of 679 runs at an average of 18.35, with a high score of 61.  This score was one of three fifties he made and came against Yorkshire in 1974.  He also made a single first-class appearance for a combined Oxford and Cambridge Universities side against the touring Indians in 1974.  Cambridge University took part in the 1974 Benson & Hedges Cup, with Smyth making his List A debut in that tournament against Kent.  He played three further List A matches during that competition, against Essex, Surrey and Sussex.  In his four List A matches, Smyth scored a total of 39 runs at an average of 9.75, with a high score of 21.

He played a single Minor Counties Championship match for his native Durham against Shropshire in 1974.

Teaching
Smyth was an assistant master at Christ's Hospital and at Gresham's School, a housemaster at Wellington College, headmaster of King's School, Bruton, 1993–2004 and of St Peter's School, York 2004–09, and Principal of Fulwood Academy 2010–14.

References

External links
 Richard Smyth at ESPNcricinfo
 Richard Smyth at CricketArchive

1951 births
Alumni of Emmanuel College, Cambridge
Cambridge University cricketers
Durham cricketers
English cricketers
Living people
Cricketers from Sunderland
Oxford and Cambridge Universities cricketers